Arriving at Your Own Door: 108 Lessons in Mindfulness (originally published on November 1, 2007 by Hachette Books) is a non-fiction, self-help book by Jon Kabat-Zinn.

Overview 
Kabat-Zinn, a professor emeritus of medicine at the University of Massachusetts, offers his plan for improving mindfulness through meditation. He talks of Mindfulness as the possibility of being fully human as we are, and of expressing the humane in our way of being and of self awareness.

The book has 180 verses that talk about the connection between mindfulness and our physical and spiritual wellbeing and can lead to healing and transformation.

A Persian translation of Jon Kabat-Zinn’s book “Arriving at Your Own Door: 108 Lessons in Mindfulness” has recently been published by Arjmand Publications in Tehran.

References 

2007 non-fiction books
Meditation
Self-help books
Mindfulness